Wick  most often refers to:

 Capillary action ("wicking")
 Candle wick, the cord used in a candle or oil lamp
 Solder wick, a copper-braided wire used to desolder electronic contacts

Wick or WICK may also refer to:

Places and placenames 
 -wick (-wich) town, settlements in Anglo-Saxon England
 vicus, the Latin word from which the Anglo-Saxon -wick, -wich, wic and -wych  found within placenames derive.
 -wick, from Old Norse vik, bay or inlet, as in Wick, Caithness, and Lerwick

Scotland
 Wick, Caithness
 Wick Airport
 Wick (Parliament of Scotland constituency) (to 1707)

England
 Wick, Bournemouth, Dorset
 Wick, Devizes, Wiltshire
 Wick, Downton, Wiltshire
 Wick, Gloucestershire
 Wick, West Sussex
 Wick, Worcestershire
 Wick St. Lawrence, Somerset
 Hackney Wick, London
 Hampton Wick, London
 Wick (ward), an electoral ward of the Hackney London Borough Council

Wales
 Wick, Vale of Glamorgan

United States
 Wick, Ohio
 Wick, West Virginia

Other uses 
 The Wick, house in Richmond Hill, London, England
 WICK, Pennsylvania AM broadcasting station 
 Wick (hieroglyph), Ancient Egyptian sign
 Wick Communications (formerly Wick Newspaper Group)
 Wick product, in probability theory
 Wick rotation, in physics
 “‘Wick”, nickname for (private) Chadwick School in Los Angeles 
 Wick, type of aircraft static discharger
 Wick (surname)
 John Wick, eponymous character in 2014– American film franchise
 Wick, or shadow, as an aspect of the Candlestick chart in stock trading

See also 
 Wic...:
 WIC
 Wick House (disambiguation)
 Wicked (disambiguation)
 Wicking (disambiguation)
 Wicks (disambiguation)
 Wyck (disambiguation)
 Vik (disambiguation)
 Weeks (surname)